Catherine Latimer (lawyer), Canadian lawyer
 Catherine Allen Latimer, New York Public Library's first African-American librarian.